58th National Board of Review Awards

Best Picture: 
 A Room with a View 
The 58th National Board of Review Awards were announced on December 11, 1986, and given on February 9, 1987.

Top 10 films
A Room with a View
Hannah and Her Sisters
My Beautiful Laundrette
The Fly
Stand By Me
The Color of Money
Children of a Lesser God
'Round Midnight
Peggy Sue Got Married
The Mission

Top Foreign films
Otello
Miss Mary
Ginger and Fred
Menage
Men...

Winners
Best Picture: 
A Room with a View
Best Foreign Language Film:
Othello , Italy/Netherlands
Best Actor:
Paul Newman - The Color of Money
Best Actress:
Kathleen Turner - Peggy Sue Got Married
Best Supporting Actor:
Daniel Day-Lewis - A Room with a View and My Beautiful Laundrette
Best Supporting Actress:
Dianne Wiest - Hannah and Her Sisters
Best Director:
Woody Allen - Hannah and Her Sisters
Career Achievement Award:
Jack Lemmon

External links
National Board of Review of Motion Pictures :: Awards for 1986

1986
1986 film awards
1986 in American cinema